Chờ is a township and capital of Yên Phong District, Bắc Ninh Province, Vietnam.

References

Populated places in Bắc Ninh province
District capitals in Vietnam
Townships in Vietnam